Where the Crawdads Sing is a 2022 American mystery drama film based on the 2018 novel of the same name by Delia Owens. It was directed by Olivia Newman from a screenplay by Lucy Alibar, and was produced by Reese Witherspoon and Lauren Neustadter. Daisy Edgar-Jones leads the cast featuring Taylor John Smith, Harris Dickinson, Michael Hyatt, Sterling Macer Jr., Jojo Regina, Garret Dillahunt, Ahna O'Reilly, and David Strathairn. The story follows an abandoned yet defiant girl, Kya, who raises herself to adulthood in a North Carolina marshland, becoming a naturalist in the process. When the town's hotshot is found dead, she is the prime suspect and is tried for murder.

The film was released in the United States on July 15, 2022, by Sony Pictures Releasing under Columbia Pictures. It received generally mixed reviews from critics, who praised Edgar-Jones's performance and the cinematography, but found the film's overall tone incoherent. Audience reception was more positive and the film became a box office success, grossing $140 million worldwide on a $24 million budget. Canadian composer Mychael Danna composed the film's soundtrack, which includes the original song "Carolina" by American singer-songwriter Taylor Swift that has been nominated for various accolades such as a Critics' Choice Award, a Golden Globe Award, a Grammy Award, and a Satellite Award.

Plot

A dead body is found and Catherine "Kya" Clark is accused of murder.

Kya's story begins when she lives in a shack with her poor family in a North Carolina marsh in 1953. As their abusive alcoholic father gambles their money away, Kya's mother and older siblings flee one by one, leaving Kya alone with him until he too abandons her at the age of seven. She survives by selling mussels at Barkley Cove's general store, owned by a warm, caring couple, Mabel and "Jumpin" Madison, who become Kya's good friends. The townspeople know her as the "Marsh Girl".

Over the years, her slightly older friend Tate Walker lends her books and teaches her to read, write, and count. They share an interest in nature and begin a romantic relationship until Tate leaves for college and breaks his promise to return to her on the 4th of July.

In 1968, Kya begins a relationship with popular local quarterback Chase Andrews, who promises her marriage. Chase gives Kya a small shell which she makes into a necklace and gives to him. A year later, Tate returns to Barkley Cove wanting to rekindle their romance, but Kya is unsure. Kya ends her relationship with Chase when she discovers he is already engaged to another girl.

Kya has her nature drawings and writings published and the income helps her keep her home. Her older brother Jodie reappears and tells her their mother died before she was able to reunite her children. Jodie promises to visit when he can.

Kya rebuffs Chase's persistent attentions and successfully fights off his rape attempt, vowing to kill him if he does not leave her alone. The threat is overheard by a fisherman. Chase returns and vandalizes Kya's home while she hides in the bushes. Days later, Chase is found dead at the bottom of a fire tower from which he had apparently fallen. The muddy bog floods at high tide, destroying any tracks from the killer, and no fingerprints are found in the tower. The shell necklace, which he had been wearing on the evening of his death, is missing from his body. Kya is charged with first-degree murder and prejudged by the suspicious townspeople.

Despite knowing Kya had been meeting with a book publisher in Greenville at the time, the police and the prosecutor speculate she could have disguised herself and made an overnight round-trip bus ride to Barkley Cove, lured Chase to the fire tower during the brief layover and killed him. With only the unfounded theory, the missing necklace, and the fisherman's testimony, Kya is found not guilty at her 1969 trial.

Kya and Tate spend the rest of their lives together. Kya publishes illustrated nature books, and is frequently visited by Jodie and his family. While boating through the swamp in her 70s, she imagines seeing her mother returning to the cabin. Tate finds Kya lying dead in the boat at their dock. Boxing up Kya's things, Tate finds a passage in her journal saying that to protect the prey, sometimes the predator has to be killed. It is accompanied by a drawing of Chase. Tate then finds the missing shell necklace, which he throws into the marsh water realizing that Kya truly did murder Chase.

Title 
Crawdads (crayfish) cannot "sing", but when Kya's mother often encouraged her to explore the marsh, she would say, "Go as far as you can–way out yonder where the crawdads sing." When Tate also used the phrase, she asked him the meaning and he replied, "Just means far in the bush where critters are wild, still behaving like critters." Delia Owens was inspired to use the phrase because her own mother had used it when she was little.

Cast

Production

On January 25, 2021, it was announced that Taylor John Smith and Harris Dickinson would join Daisy Edgar-Jones in the film adaptation of Delia Owens' best-selling novel Where the Crawdads Sing, produced by Hello Sunshine and 3000 Pictures for Sony Pictures. Olivia Newman was then hired to direct the screenplay written by Lucy Alibar. That March, David Strathairn and Jayson Warner Smith joined the cast. In April, Garret Dillahunt, Michael Hyatt, Ahna O'Reilly, Sterling Macer Jr., and Jojo Regina were also added, and in June 2021, Eric Ladin was cast as well.

Principal photography took place from March 30 to June 28, 2021, in New Orleans and Houma, Louisiana.

Music

Where the Crawdads Sing (Original Motion Picture Soundtrack) was scored by Canadian composer Mychael Danna. The soundtrack contains 22 tracks. All of the tracks were composed by Danna except the original song "Carolina" (2022). American singer-songwriter Taylor Swift wrote and performed "Carolina" for the film, before the film even proceeded into production. Swift stated that she "got absolutely lost in [the book] when [she] read it years ago" and "wanted to create something haunting and ethereal" for the film when she heard it was being produced. Every other track of the soundtrack was created in post-production.

Release
The film had its world premiere at the Museum of Modern Art in New York City on July 11, 2022, and was released in the United States and Canada on July 15, 2022. It was previously scheduled for June 24, 2022, before being delayed to July 22, 2022, and was then moved up a week to July 15. It was released in the United Kingdom on July 22, 2022.

The film was released digitally on September 6, 2022, and on Blu-ray and DVD the following week on September 13, 2022.

Reception

Box office 
Where the Crawdads Sing grossed $90.2 million in the United States and Canada, and $50 million in other territories, for a worldwide total of $140.2 million.

In the United States and Canada, Where the Crawdads Sing was released alongside Paws of Fury: The Legend of Hank and Mrs. Harris Goes to Paris, and was initially projected to gross around $10 million from 3,626 theaters in its opening weekend. After making $7.3 million on its first day (including $2.3 million from Thursday night previews), estimates were raised to $16 million. It went on to debut to $17.3 million, finishing third at the box office, behind holdovers Thor: Love and Thunder and Minions: The Rise of Gru. Forbes stated the film is "a big win for Sony and for the notion of non-franchise, adult-skewing, female-targeted studio programmers having a future in theatrical release." Where the Crawdads Sing made $10.4 million in its second weekend, finishing fourth, with Deadline Hollywood noting the 40% drop as a "great hold" for a "female skewing movie during the pandemic." By August 18, 2022, the film had grossed four times its budget of $24 million; Forbes said this is "yet another example of how what Hollywood thinks will make money isn't always the same as what does make money" and that Where the Crawdads Sing filled the vacuum of successful female-centric films in theatres post-pandemic.

On the film's unexpected success, Witherspoon said "This movie wasn't on a lot of people's radars—and it's counterprogramming, I know—but it's a return to real filmmaking. It's a heart-and-soul experience on film with beautiful sets and beautiful costumes and wonderful actors. It's almost nostalgic for what you wanted to see in the summer."

Critical response 

On the review aggregator website Rotten Tomatoes, 34% of 212 critics' reviews are positive, with an average rating of 5.2/10. The website's critics consensus reads, "Daisy Edgar-Jones gives it her all, but Where the Crawdads Sing is ultimately unable to distill its source material into a tonally coherent drama." Metacritic, which uses a weighted average, assigned the film a score of 43 out of 100, based on 46 critics, indicating "mixed or average reviews". Various critics highlighted Edgar-Jones's performance as the best aspect of the film.

Consequence critic Liz Shannon Miller rated the film A–, describing it as a heartfelt, "lush, lyrical and engrossing Southern Gothic drama". Miller also stated "it's hard to imagine literally anyone else capturing Kya's innocence and intelligence as ably as [Edgar-Jones] does." Leonard Maltin praised Newman's direction, the cinematography, production design, and music, and said Edgar-Jones "effortlessly commands the big screen" by "inhabiting the character of Kya Clark". Richard Roeper of the Chicago Sun-Times called Where the Crawdads Sing "one of the most gorgeously photographed films of the year" and praised the performances of Edgar-Jones and Straitharn. Owen Gleiberman, chief film critic in Variety, dubbed the film "a mystery, a romance, a back-to-nature reverie full of gnarled trees and hanging moss, and a parable of women's power and independence in a world crushed under by masculine will"; he highlighted Edgar-Jones "doleful, earnest-eyed sensuality". CNN journalist Brian Lowry praised Edgar-Jones's "old-fashioned movie-star appeal" and summarized the film as "a smallish movie that hits just enough of the right notes." James Berardinelli rated the film three out of four stars, and complimented the "old-fashioned" approach in storytelling, anchored by Edgar-Jones's "stellar performance".

Leigh Monson of The A.V. Club gave the film a B rating, and said the film "binds a lonely young woman's love story to a legal potboiler", but commended the cast's performance, especially Edgar-Jones's "magnetic leading presence". Scott Mendelson of Forbes wrote Where the Crawdads Sing is "well-acted, handsomely staged and features interesting actors playing somewhat interesting characters in a single film sans any cinematic universe aspirations." /Film Haoi-Tran Bui rated the film a six out of ten and wrote, "thanks to a guileless and steely central performance by Edgar-Jones, Where the Crawdads Sing manages to find some harmony between its melodramatic swings and its slow-building mystery." Harry Guerin, multimedia journalist for RTÉ, gave the film three out of five stars, and said it is "always watchable" but "loses some goodwill by shoe-horning too much into the third act and moving too quickly towards the credits." Pat Padua of The Washington Post described the film as "Southern-fried The Blue Lagoon meets Murder, She Wrote — and topped off with a sprinkling of To Kill a Mockingbird," in which Edgar-Jones "convincingly" portrays the protagonist's "haunted shyness." He rated the film 2.5 stars out of four.

Assigning the film a C+ rating, David Ehrlich of IndieWire felt the film "is a lot more fun as a hothouse page-turner than it is as a soulful tale of feminine self-sufficiency" but added that Edgar-Jones's strong performance was its saving grace. Thelma Adams of AARP scored it a three out of five stars; Adams said the film is "a cross between The Notebook, Fried Green Tomatoes and To Kill a Mockingbird" that will satisfy fans of the book, but nevertheless "suffers from abuse overload." Bilge Ebiri of Vulture said the film is "an atmospheric and gleefully overheated melodrama" that is faithful to the novel, but "doesn't seem particularly interested in standing on its own, in being a movie"; however, Ebiri praised the character of Kya and Edgar-Jones's talent at portraying Kya's "wounded inner life". Maligning the film as "downright cringey", Laura Miller of Slate argued that it deviates from the book by glamorizing Kya; "for someone who hides like a timorous fawn whenever visitors come around, the movie's Kya is as well turned out as a heroine in a country music video." Peter Bradshaw, in his one-star review in The Guardian, described Where the Crawdads Sing as an "uncompromisingly terrible southern gothic schmaltzer [...] a relentless surge of solemnly ridiculous nonsense in the style of romdram maestro Nicholas Sparks" and termed Kya as a "Manic Pixie Dream Girl Murder Suspect".

Audience response 
Audiences polled by CinemaScore gave the film an average grade of "A–" on an A+ to F scale. PostTrak reported 87% of audience members gave it a positive score (with an average rating of 4.5 out of 5 stars), with 70% saying they would definitely recommend it.

Of the opening weekend audience, 32% came with someone who wanted to see the film, while 30% saw the film because they were fans of the book. Anthony D'Alessandro of Deadline Hollywood said the film is an example of a harshly reviewed film beating projections, "the pic's opening, 70% ahead of where tracking thought it would be. That's a wonderful thing for the business when Rotten Tomatoes doesn't ruin a movie's ticket sales." Ronald Meyer of Collider stated that Where the Crawdads Sing "may not be one of summer 2022's highest grossing—or critically acclaimed—films, but it is among the season's most profitable."

Accolades

Notes

References

External links
 
 

2022 films
2020s American films
2020s coming-of-age drama films
2020s English-language films
2020s feminist films
2020s mystery films
American coming-of-age drama films
American courtroom films
American feminist films
American mystery films
Columbia Pictures films
Films based on American novels
Films produced by Reese Witherspoon
Films scored by Mychael Danna
Films set in the 1950s
Films set in the 1960s
Films set in 1965
Films set in the 1970s
Films set in 1970
Films set in North Carolina
Films shot in Louisiana
Films shot in New Orleans
Murder mystery films
Southern Gothic films
TSG Entertainment films